Chen Dongqi is a Chinese sport shooter. She represents China at the 2020 Summer Olympics in Tokyo.

References

1988 births
Living people
Chinese female sport shooters
Shooters at the 2020 Summer Olympics
Olympic shooters of China
People from Chifeng
Asian Games medalists in shooting
Shooters at the 2014 Asian Games
Medalists at the 2014 Asian Games
Asian Games gold medalists for China
Asian Games silver medalists for China
21st-century Chinese women